These are lists of Bundesliga players who have made the most appearances in this league, which is the top level of the German football league system and started in 1963.

Players with most Bundesliga appearances
 Position (Pos): GK = Goalkeeper, DF = Defender, MF = Midfielder, FW = Forward
 First / Last: year of first / last Bundesliga appearance
 Seasons (Seas): number of Bundesliga seasons in which the player made at least one appearance
Players are sorted by number of appearances, then by year of first appearance. Current Bundesliga players and their current clubs are shown in bold.

Most Bundesliga appearances by club 
 First / Last: year of the first / last Bundesliga appearance for the club
 Seasons (Sea): number of Bundesliga seasons in which the player made at least one appearance for the club
Current Bundesliga clubs and players are shown in bold.

See also
List of Bundesliga top scorers
Bundesliga records and statistics

References 

 
Bundesliga players
Association football player non-biographical articles
Bundesliga